Skáleyjar is a group of islands of the Breiðafjörður fjord in Westfjords, Iceland. In total, Skáleyjar consists of around 140 to 160 islands, and is an estimated  in length.

References

Islands of Iceland